This is a list of films produced by the Tollywood film industry based in Madras in 1951.

References

 Thilottama

External links
 Earliest Telugu language films at IMDb.com (136 to 148)

1951
Telugu
Telugu films